The 1987 Chatham Cup was the 60th annual nationwide knockout football competition in New Zealand.

Up to the last 16 of the competition, the cup was run in three regions (northern, central, and southern). National League teams received a bye until the final 32 stage. In all, 143 teams took part in the competition. Note: Different sources give different numberings for the rounds of the competition: some start round one with the beginning of the regional qualifications; others start numbering from the first national knock-out stage. The former numbering scheme is used in this article.

The 1987 final

As with the 1986 competition, the final was held over two legs, one at the home ground of each finalist. In all, ten goals were scored in the two matches, a record for a finals competition (though not normally considered as a record for a final, due to the two-legged nature of the tie). The two teams involved, Gisborne City and Christchurch United, also finished first and second in the year's national league, though in that competition Christchurch had the upper hand.

The first leg, held in Gisborne, was an exciting if one-sided affair, with a high standard of play. Gisborne City's first goal came in just the third minute, through Fijian player Stan Morrell. Paul Nixon was the second to get his name in the scorebook, and at the break it was 2-0. Morell got a second ten minutes after the interval, but the last 20 minutes of the match saw a flurry of goals, with Johan Verweij reducing the deficit before two late strikes from Kevin Birch and Steve Sumner stretched the Gisborne tally to five.

Christchurch had their work cut out to pull back a four-goal deficit at their home ground, and though this was never likely, the game was an enjoyable one. The score seesawed, with Gisborne twice coming back to equalise after going a goal down to the hosts. Paul Nicholls put the southerners ahead, but Sean Byrne's equaliser took the teams to the half-time break level. In the 75th minute Allan Carville doubled the Christchurch total, but a late penalty strike from Brian Strutt ensured that the second leg would finish 2–2.

The Jack Batty Memorial Trophy for player of the final was awarded to Gisborne City goalkeeper Dave Reynolds.

Results

Third Round

* Won on penalties by New Plymouth (5-4)

Fourth Round

* Won on penalties by Manukau City (4-1)

Christchurch United and Dunedin City both received byes to the Fifth Round

Fifth Round

Sixth Round

* Manukau City won 4-3 on penalties

Semi-finals

Final

Gisborne City won 7-3 on aggregate.

References

Rec.Sport.Soccer Statistics Foundation New Zealand 1987 page
UltimateNZSoccer website 1987 Chatham Cup page

Chatham Cup
Chatham Cup
Chatham Cup
Chat